Stewart Elliott (born March 1, 1965) is an American thoroughbred jockey.

Elliott was born, in Toronto, Ontario, Canada. He grew up in horse racing; his father was a jockey for many years, his mother rode show horses and was a riding instructor, and his uncle owns a racing stable in Canada. At age seven, his family moved to race in Hong Kong, where they remained for six years before going to the United States. Stewart began riding professionally at age 16, mainly at Philadelphia Park Racetrack, a small racetrack in suburban Philadelphia, Pennsylvania.  He has been the racetrack's most successful jockey for a number of years and for the past three seasons has been named Pennsylvania's top rider. On May 13, 2003, he reached a prestigious milestone, riding his 3,000th career winner. On January 18, 2009, he won the 4,000th race of his career at Philadelphia Park.

On May 1, 2004, Elliott became the first jockey in twenty-five years to win the Kentucky Derby in his first appearance in the race. His horse, Smarty Jones, became the first unbeaten Derby winner since Seattle Slew in 1977. To add to his victory was Elliott's 10% share of the almost $6 million in purse and bonuses that represented the largest payday for any jockey and horse in racing history. Two weeks later, Elliott rode Smarty Jones to a record-breaking win in the second leg of the Triple Crown of Thoroughbred Racing, the Preakness Stakes. In the Belmont Stakes, the third leg, Elliott took Smarty Jones out early in the backstretch, and Birdstone passed him late in the race. Some have criticized Elliott's ride, saying he "pushed" the horse too early in the race, but other experts have said: "he was doing the only thing he could do to win the race."

During his breakthrough year in 2004, he won 262 races out of 1,363 mounts with earnings of $14,533,061.

In 2005, he won 143 races out of 860 mounts with earnings of $5,393,661.

On January 11, 2008, Elliott rode four winners on one racecard at Aqueduct Racetrack.

On June 1, 2010, Woodbine Entertainment announced that Elliott had been voted the Avelino Gomez Memorial Award for his contribution to the sport of Thoroughbred racing.

In 2017 Stewart Elliott was voted the George Woolf Memorial Jockey Award, a prestigious honor voted on by thoroughbred horse racing jockeys in North America. It is given to a jockey who has demonstrated high standards of personal and professional conduct, on and off the racetrack.

On August 9, 2020, Elliot became the 36th North American jockey to have won more than 5,000 races.

Year-end charts

References
 ABC News Person of the Week - Stewart Elliott
 Stewart Elliott at the NTRA

1965 births
Living people
American jockeys
Animal sportspeople from Ontario
Avelino Gomez Memorial Award winners
Canadian expatriate sportspeople in the United States 
Canadian expatriates in Hong Kong
Canadian emigrants to the United States
Canadian jockeys
Sportspeople from Philadelphia
Sportspeople from Toronto